Yashpal Arya is a 7-time MLA from Uttar Pradesh (twice) and Uttarakhand (five times) combined. He is a former Minister of Transportation, Social Welfare, Minority and Students' Welfare in the Government of Uttarakhand under Bharatiya Janata Party's rule. Currently, he is an Indian National Congress leader and member of the Uttarakhand Legislative Assembly.  He is a former Speaker of the Uttarakhand Legislative Assembly under Indian National Congress' rule. He was elected from Mukteshwar constituency in the 2007 Uttarakhand state assembly elections.

He was the President of the Congress Party's Uttarakhand Pradesh Congress Committee (Uttarakhand PCC) from 2007 through 2014. He was elected from Bajpur Assembly constituency in 2012 and was being thought to be one of the frontrunners for the chief ministerial candidature until the Congress high command made Vijay Bahuguna, son of former Uttar Pradesh CM late Hemvati Nandan Bahuguna swear into the post. 

On 16 January 2017, Arya joined the Bharatiya Janata Party where he served as the Cabinet Minister of Transportation, Social Welfare, Minority and Students' Welfare, Government of Uttarakhand from 18th March, 2017 to 11th October, 2021 in the Trivendra Singh Rawat's and Tirath Singh Rawat's Cabinet.

On 11 October 2021, Arya along with his son Sanjiv Arya ( MLA, Nainital) returned to Congress. In the Uttarakhand Assembly Elections 2022, he won Bajpur seat again but this time as an INC candidate, after which he was appointed the Leader of Opposition in the Uttarakhand Legislative Assembly.

Positions held

Within Party

Electoral performance

References

 https://www.newstodaynetwork.com/haldwani-social-welfare-minister-arya-can-contest-in-the-lok-sabha-election-such-a-benefit/

Living people
Uttarakhand MLAs 2022–2027
Indian National Congress politicians
Speakers of the Uttarakhand Legislative Assembly
1952 births
Bharatiya Janata Party politicians from Uttarakhand
Uttarakhand MLAs 2017–2022
Irrigation Ministers of Uttarakhand